Klokoč is a village in central Croatia, in the municipality of Vojnić, Karlovac County.

Demographics
According to the 2011 census, the village of Klokoč
has 64 inhabitants. This represents 19.28% of its pre-war population according to the 1991 census.

The 1991 census recorded that 97.89% of the village population were ethnic Serbs (325/332), 0.30% were Croat (1/332), 0.30% were Slovenes (1/332) and 1.51% were of other/unknown ethnic origin (5/332).

References

Populated places in Karlovac County
Serb communities in Croatia